Linderiella is a genus of fairy shrimp, previously placed in its own family, Linderiellidae, but now usually considered part of the Chirocephalidae. It comprises five species – Linderiella occidentalis and L. santarosae from California, L. africana from the Atlas Mountains in Morocco, L. massaliensis from southeastern France and L. baetica from southern Spain.

References

Branchiopoda genera
Anostraca